The Notrim (singular: Noter) were Jewish auxiliaries, mainly police, set up in 1936 by the British in Mandatory Palestine during the 1936–39 Arab revolt. The British authorities maintained, financed and armed the Notrim until the end of the Mandate in 1948, even though they knew that while the force was nominally answerable to the Palestine Police Force, it was in fact controlled by the Haganah.

Jewish units during the Arab Revolt (1936–39)
During the Arab revolt, the British Mandate authorities needed local manpower specifically to help with defending the borders of Mandatory Palestine from guerrilla infiltrators coming from French-ruled Syria and Lebanon, and to protect the Iraq Petroleum pipeline crossing northern Palestine to the port of Haifa. Once equipped and trained, the Notrim units helped protect Jewish lives and property. The Hebrew term was used collectively for members of any of three Jewish organisations authorised by the British: the largest was the highly mobile Jewish Settlement Police, followed by the ghafirs or Supernumerary Police, a lightly armed Jewish "militia-police", and by guides for the British army patrols. Members were recruited almost entirely from the Jewish underground militia, the Haganah. The ghafir (also spelled ghaffir) concept was not new; first set up as locally organised village guards in brigand-infested Egypt of the 19th century, they were adopted into a new national police under Lord Kitchener, provided with weapons, trained and paid by the government to whom they answered, while also remaining under the command of the local community leadership.

As notrim thousands of young men had their first experience of military training, which Moshe Shertok and Eliyahu Golomb cited as one of the fruits of the Haganah's policy of havlagah (restraint).

World War II
On 6 August 1940 Anthony Eden, the British War Secretary, informed Parliament that the Cabinet had decided to recruit Arab and Jewish units as battalions of the Royal East Kent Regiment (the "Buffs"). At a luncheon with Chaim Weizmann on 3 September, Winston Churchill approved the large-scale recruitment of Jewish forces in Palestine and the training of their officers. A further 10,000 men (no more than 3,000 from Palestine) were to be recruited to Jewish units in the British Army for training in the United Kingdom.

Faced with Field Marshal Rommel's advance in Egypt, the British government decided on 15 April 1941 that the 10,000 Jews dispersed in the single defense companies of the Buffs should be prepared for war service at the battalion level and that another 10,000 should also be mobilised along with 6,000 Supernumerary Police and 40,000 to 50,000 home guard. The plans were approved by Field Marshal John Dill.

The Special Operations Executive in Cairo approved a Haganah proposal for guerilla activities in northern Palestine led by the Palmach, as part of which Yitzhak Sadeh devised "Plan North" for an armed enclave in the Carmel range from which the Yishuv could defend the region and attack Nazi communications and supply lines, if necessary. British intelligence also trained a small radio network under Moshe Dayan to act as spy cells in the event of a German invasion.

1945-48 and aftermath
The end of the Second World War in Europe marked a sharp political change in Mandate Palestine.

After World War II, the Notrim became the core of the Israeli Military Police.

See also
 Jewish Supernumerary Police
 Mobile Guards

References

Bibliography

Law enforcement in Mandatory Palestine
Haganah units
1936–1939 Arab revolt in Palestine
Law enforcement in Israel
Jewish organizations in Mandatory Palestine
Anthony Eden